Fox News Talk is a satellite radio channel that showcases talk shows and news reports from Fox News Channel personalities, along with other Fox News and talk programming. Fox News Talk carries a combination of Fox News syndicated radio programming, Fox News Channel show audio simulcasts, and Fox newscasts at the top of the hour.

Fox News Radio programs carried include shows hosted by Brian Kilmeade (9 a.m. to 12 p.m. E.T.), Jimmy Failla (12 p.m. to 3 p.m. E.T.) and Guy Benson (3 p.m. to 6 p.m. E.T.). Each show is repeated late nights and on weekends.

The Sean Hannity Show, which predates the formation of the Fox News radio division, is not carried by Fox News Talk. Premiere Radio Networks produces and distributes the show, heard on satellite radio via Sirius XM Patriot Channel 125. The same was true of Glenn Beck's show during his time with Fox News Channel.  Beck's show is currently heard on Sirius XM's "Triumph" Channel 132.

History
After an advertisement appeared from XM Satellite Radio stating that Fox News Channel would soon be "only heard on XM Satellite Radio" and another stated to hear Fox News Talk "you can't be Sirius", FNC's programming vanished from Sirius Satellite Radio for unknown reasons, then returned to Sirius later.  Despite pleas made to Sirius listeners by hosts Tony Snow (then) and Alan Colmes to ask Sirius to keep Fox News Channel programming, on January 1, 2006, FNC programming again disappeared from the Sirius lineup.  On January 2, 2006, Fox News Talk premiered only on XM Satellite Radio.

An agreement was reached between Fox and Sirius within a couple of months, and Fox News Talk was added to the Sirius lineup, along with the return of the Fox News Channel audio simulcast, on March 14, 2006.

In April 2006, morning show host Tony Snow left the network to pursue a career as the White House Press Secretary. Replacing him was the duo of Brian Kilmeade, and Andrew Napolitano, with their new show titled Brian and the Judge. Napolitano left the show in 2010, leaving Kilmeade to host solo.

XM Radio Canada added the channel on June 1, 2007.

In September 2007, Tom Sullivan joined Fox News Radio and helped launch Fox Business.  Ten years later, Sullivan left Fox News in 2017 to join a national syndicator with his radio show.

Also carried was Westwood One's syndicated The Radio Factor with former FNC personality Bill O'Reilly.  O'Reilly was moved out of the live time slot on January 15, 2009, anticipating his departure from the show on February 26 of that year.  Fox News announced it would move John Gibson to the noon-to-3 p.m. time slot, after Bill O'Reilly left the time slot. Gibson also left Fox News Talk in June 2017.

On May 4, 2011, Fox News Talk moved to XM 126 from XM 168 and to Sirius 126 from Sirius 145.  It now airs on both Sirius and XM at Channel 450.

As of no later than October 12, 2019, Fox News Talk was removed from the SiriusXM lineup.  Several posts on Facebook on October 12 asked SiriusXM why with no official response.  The Lineup Card released on October 15 no longer shows the station listed.

Over-the-air broadcasting
"Fox News Talk" is also the name of the distribution service Fox provides to broadcast radio stations for the talk shows it produces.  This service does not include Fox Across America, which airs only on satellite radio, and did not include The Radio Factor, which was syndicated to radio stations by Westwood One.

References

External links
 Official Web site
 Fox News Talk on Sirius XM Radio

Fox Corporation subsidiaries
XM Satellite Radio channels
Sirius Satellite Radio channels
Digital-only radio stations
News and talk radio stations in the United States
Radio stations established in 2006